Amos Gabriel Makalla (born 16 September 1971) is a Tanzanian CCM politician and has been a Member of Parliament for Mvomero constituency since 2010. As of 2013, he was the Deputy Minister of Information, Youth, Culture, and Sports.

Makalla received his Masters of Business Administration degree from Mzumbe University.

As of 2018, Makalla was Regional Commissioner for Mbeya.

References

1971 births
Living people
Chama Cha Mapinduzi MPs
Tanzanian MPs 2010–2015
Deputy government ministers of Tanzania
Tanzanian accountants
Ruvu Secondary School alumni
Galanos Secondary School alumni
Institute of Finance Management alumni
Tanzanian Roman Catholics